Yngwie Malmsteen is a Swedish neoclassical metal musician. After tenures in the bands Steeler and Alcatrazz, he started his solo career in 1984 with the release of Rising Force, which was the name of his first band in 1978 featuring bassist Marcel Jacob and drummer Zepp Urgard. The original 1984 lineup of Malmsteen's band included vocalist Jeff Scott Soto, former Jethro Tull drummer Barriemore Barlow and keyboardist Jens Johansson, with Jacob added as the first touring bassist. The current lineup includes keyboardist Nick Marino (since 2011), bassist Emilio Martinez (since 2017) and drummer Brian Wilson (since 2018). Marino (live) and Malmsteen (studio) perform lead vocals.

History

1984–1995
Malmsteen released his debut solo album Rising Force in 1984, which featured vocalist Jeff Scott Soto, keyboardist Jens Johansson and drummer Barriemore Barlow. Soto and Johansson remained for the next year's follow-up Marching Out, which was credited as a band effort under the name "Yngwie J. Malmsteen's Rising Force" and saw the addition of bassist Marcel Jacob and new drummer Anders Johansson (Jens' brother). Jacob was replaced on tour by Wally Voss. Soto left in 1985 and was replaced by Mark Boals, who performed on the 1986 album Trilogy but was fired by Malmsteen before its release after an altercation. Soto returned for the album's tour, after which it was reported in 1987 that Mark Weitz would perform on the next album.

Weitz was soon replaced by Joe Lynn Turner, who performed on 1988's Odyssey. The subsequent tour spawned Malmsteen's first live album Trial by Fire: Live in Leningrad, which featured bassist Barry Dunaway. The band's lineup changed dramatically in late 1989, as Jens Johansson joined Dio and Turner joined Deep Purple. Anders Johansson also left "a few months" after his brother Jens, primarily due to frustration with the group's new management. The Rising Force group was rebuilt as an all-Swedish lineup, with new vocalist Göran Edman, bassist Svante Henryson, drummer Michael Von Knorring and keyboardist Mats Olausson, all of whom contributed to 1990's Eclipse. Von Korring left after the album's release and was replaced by Pete Barnacle on tour, before Bo Werner joined to record 1992's Fire & Ice.

1992–2002
During 1992 and 1993, Malmsteen took a break due to the death of his manager, being dropped by Elektra Records, and his wrongful arrest. He subsequently enlisted vocalist Michael Vescera, drummer Mike Terrana and bassist Barry Sparks to join Olausson in the Rising Force band. B.J. Zampa replaced Terrana during the tour for The Seventh Sign, before Shane Gaalaas took over later in the year. Following the promotion of Magnum Opus in 1995, Malmsteen went on a temporary hiatus. He returned the following year to release Inspiration, an album of cover versions featuring several former bandmates, including vocalists Soto, Boals and Turner. Boals returned for the album's tour – which also featured Dunaway and drummer Tommy Aldridge – before Mats Levén took over at the end of 1996.

Malmsteen enlisted Cozy Powell to perform drums on Facing the Animal in 1997. The drummer was also scheduled to play on the next tour, but was forced to pull out in March 1998 after suffering a foot injury in a "minor motorcycle accident". Powell later died in a car crash on 5 April. He was replaced for the touring cycle by Jonas Östman. By 1999, the band included returning vocalist Boals and new drummer John Macaluso, with Alchemy released before the end of the year. Randy Coven took over from Dunaway for the album's touring cycle, although bass on 2000's War to End All Wars was performed by Malmsteen. By the time the album was released, however, Boals had left Malmsteen's band again. Jørn Lande took his place, on the recommendation of his Ark bandmate Macaluso.

Lande only remained with Malmsteen until 8 April 2001, when he was involved in a backstage altercation which led to his departure. Out of "loyalty" to his Ark bandmate, Macaluso also left the band following the event. After it was initially reported that Soto would return to take over on vocals, the spot was later filled by Boals. It was also initially reported that Metal Symphony of Darkness drummer Ed Rock would replace Macaluso, although this was quickly altered to be Cherry Poppin' Daddies drummer Tim Donahue. After the conclusion of the tour, Malmsteen introduced a brand new lineup of his band: vocalist Doogie White, keyboardist Derek Sherinian, drummer Patrick Johansson and touring bassist Mick Cervino. Attack!! was recorded and released as this lineup's only album the following year.

2002 onwards
Touring for Attack!! began in December 2002 and featured Joakim Svalberg on keyboards. Rudy Sarzo replaced Cervino in February 2004, although by April he had left to join Dio's touring lineup. Cervino returned to the band for the tour in promotion of 2005's Unleash the Fury. Nick Z. Marino replaced Svalberg for a run of shows later in the year, before Sherinian returned for US tour dates in 2006. In February 2008, it was announced that White had parted ways with Malmsteen due to musical differences. His replacement was quickly confirmed to be former Judas Priest and Iced Earth frontman Tim "Ripper" Owens. Michael Troy and Bjorn Englen were subsequently announced as the replacements for Sherinian and Cervino, respectively. Marino rejoined the band in 2009, and in 2012 Englen was replaced by Ralph Ciavolino. Leading up to the release of Spellbound, rumors began to circulate that Owens had left the band. This was later confirmed by the singer, who was not featured on the album.

Owens was not replaced – Malmsteen and Marino have handled lead vocal duties since his departure. In 2015, Johansson left to join W.A.S.P. Mark Ellis took his place and performed on Malmsteen's next studio album, World on Fire. By 2018, Ellis had been replaced by Brian Wilson.

Members

Current

Former

Timelines

Touring

Recording

Lineups

References

External links
Yngwie Malmsteen official website

Malmsteen, Yngwie
 

sv:Bandmedlemmar Yngwie Malmsteen/Rising Force